The Mandailing is an ethnic group in Sumatera, Indonesia that is commonly associated with the Batak people. They are found mainly in the northern section of the island of Sumatra in Indonesia. They came under the influence of the Kaum Padri who ruled the Minangkabau of Tanah Datar. As a result, the Mandailing were influenced by Muslim culture and converted to Islam. There are also a group of Mandailing in Malaysia, especially in the states of Selangor and Perak. They are closely related to the Angkola.

Etymology 
The etymology of 'Mandailing' is said to be a compounding of the words mande, meaning 'mother', and hilang, meaning 'lost'. Thus, the name is said to mean "lost mother". The Mandailing society is patriarchal, employing family names, or marga. The well known margas in Mandailing clan are:Lubis, Nasution, Siregar, Ritonga, Hasibuan, Harahap, Dalimunthe (originally from Munthe), Matondang, Rangkuti, Parinduri, Puasa, Pulungan, Rambe, Daulae(y), Pohan, Batubara (not to be confused with the Batu Bara people from the east coast of Sumatra), Barus and Hutajulu.

History 

According to Tamboen's account (1952) the Mandailing, along with other sub-ethnic Batak groups are the descendants of one man by the name of Batak; who migrated to the south before the coming of the Portuguese and Dutch colonisation of Sumatra. Moreover, many Mandailing people are Minangkabau descent from Pagaruyung in Minangkabau highlands, such as Nasution clan. Dutch colonization in Sumatra caused the Mandailing to be included as a sub-category of the Batak, as part of a 'wedge policy' to create a non-Muslim buffer state called Batakland between the powerful Muslim Achehnese and Minangkabau nations. The Mandailing were associated with the Toba Batak people instead of being recognized as a distinct ethnic minority. Consequently, the Mandailing people have been torn between two cultural and ethnic identities, namely Batak-Mandailing in Indonesia and Malay-Mandailing in Malaysia.

The Padri War 
The Padri War, which took place in West Sumatra and spread to the inland parts of East Sumatra between 1803 and 1845, caused an exodus of large groups of Mandailing from their homeland to peninsular Malaya. Among them were groups led by Raja Asal, the overlord of the Mandailings, and his nephew Raja Bilah. Together with Sutan Puasa, they were embroiled in the Klang War from 1866 to 1873, also known as the Selangor War.

Raja Asal and Raja Bilah fled to Perak, where their followers settled in Lower Perk and the Kinta Valley. The British appointed Raja Bilah penghulu of Blanja while his son Raja Yacob became penghulu of Tronoh, which generated large revenues after the opening of the Tronoh Mines, the largest tin producer in the world in the 1920s.

Region 
Mandailing is the name of region Luat Mandailing, which is now almost in Mandailing Natal Regency in North Sumatra. The first group who came to this region were the Lubis and Nasution, later followed by the Siregar, Harahap and so forth. Nasution and Lubis are the biggest groups in Mandailing clan. While other groups, such as Pulungan, Harahap, Matondang, Rangkuti, and others are the smaller groups of Luat Mandailing. Harahap and Siregar dwell almost in Luat Angkola, which now belongs to South Tapanuli Regency, situated between Regency and North Tapanuli Regency.

Religion
The Mandailing people are almost entirely Muslims. Opinion varies in when Islam first arrived in the region, where the 19th century, 18th century or even earlier have been suggested. In the 19th century, a portion of the Mandailing were converted to Islam during the Padri War when Muslim clerics from west Sumatra pressured them to adopt the religion. After conversion, Islam took firm roots in the Mandailing people through integration with the larger Muslim Malay world. The Mandailing people were able to retain many of their native religious practices and adopted a indigenized form of Islam until the modern era, especially in Malaysia where they were forced to conform to state-sponsored Islam.</ref>

Migrations 

The Mandailing people are also known as the great travellers as more and more of the Mandailings are migrating to the various regions in the country as well as around the world. Many of the Mandailings are playing the important roles of the nation. The Indonesian government considered the Mandailings as one of the main tribes in the country. Many Mandailings keep detailed family tree records as it has become the family tradition. It is reported that 98% of the Mandailing ethnic group are Muslim. There are approximately more than one hundred thousand Mandailings In Malaysia nowadays. Many of the Mandailings in Malaysia are visiting their ancestors in Mandailing Regency in Indonesia as it has been a tradition to keep the brotherhood and strong bond of unity among the Mandailings.

The Mandailing language is still used by the descendants of Mandailing immigrants in Malaysia, although language shift to Malay is observed among the younger generation.

Culture 
The Mandailing classic of daun ubi tumbuk or mashed tapioca leaves, lush with bunga kantan, lemongrass and coconut milk flavor is a famous food among the Mandailing people.

They have a traditional ensemble of drums called Gordang Sambilan.

Controversy
The generalization of the term "Batak" being applied to the Mandailing people are not accepted by the those who descended from their customary region, although majority of the population consider themselves as part of Batak ethnic group. The Mandailing people has blood ties, kinship, language, writing script, social systems, arts, customs and norms that are different from the Batak and Malay people.

Notable people

See also

 Lumbandolok

Notes

References

Further reading
 
 
 

 
Ethnic groups in Indonesia
Ethnic groups in Sumatra
History of Sumatra
Muslim communities of Indonesia
Ethnography
Batak
Batak ethnic groups
Ethnic groups in Malaysia